Oleksandr Ivanovych Zatynaiko (born 30 January 1949, Otdradne, Hrebinka Raion, Ukrainian SSR) is a member of the Ukrainian military, Colonel General who served as the Chief of General Staff and Commander of the Ukrainian Ground Forces.

Zatynaiko started his military career in the Group of Soviet Forces in Germany in 1970 after graduating the Kyiv Higher Combined Arms College. After graduating from the M. V. Frunze Military Academy in 1973, he served in military units of Kyiv Military District where he held command of a battalion and later a regiment. In 1985–1987 Zatynaiko was a commander of the Soviet separate brigade in Cuba. In 1987–1991 in Siberian Military District he commanded a division and was awarded the military order "For service to the Homeland".

In 1993 Zatynaiko graduated from the Military Academy of the General Staff of the Armed Forces of Russia. The same year he was placed in command of the 13th Army Corps in Ukraine (former Soviet 13th Army). In 1996–1998 Zatynaiko was a chief of the General Staff of the Ukrainian Armed Forces. In 1997 under his command there was developed the "Ukrainian Armed Forces build up program until 2010".

In 1998 the President of Ukraine Leonid Kuchma placed Zatynaiko in charge of the Southern Operational Command which was perceived as a demotion. However Minister of Defence of Ukraine Oleksandr Kuzmuk explained that it is in no way related to miscalculations in development of the Army as Southern Operational Command is the most important in a sphere of responsibility. In 2001–2002 Zatynaiko was a commander of the Ukrainian Ground Forces.

In 2002 he returned in charge of General Staff and developed program of further development of Armed Forces "Defence policy. The White Book" with a deep analysis of armament and technology status of the Ukrainian military.

References

External links 
Oleksandr Zatynaiko. Hrebinka city website.

1949 births
Living people
People from Poltava Oblast
Colonel Generals of Ukraine
Chiefs of the General Staff (Ukraine)
Frunze Military Academy alumni
Military Academy of the General Staff of the Armed Forces of Russia alumni
Recipients of the Order of Bohdan Khmelnytsky, 1st class
Recipients of the Order of Bohdan Khmelnytsky, 2nd class
Recipients of the Order of Bohdan Khmelnytsky, 3rd class